The 1985 Atlantic Coast Conference men's basketball tournament was held in Atlanta, Georgia, at the Omni Coliseum from March 8–10. Georgia Tech defeated North Carolina,  57–54, to win the championship, the first for the Yellow Jackets. Mark Price of Georgia Tech was named the tournament MVP.

Bracket

References

Tournament
ACC men's basketball tournament
Basketball competitions in Atlanta
College basketball tournaments in Georgia (U.S. state)
ACC men's basketball tournament
1980s in Atlanta
ACC men's basketball tournament